CBRJ may refer to:

 CBRJ (AM), a radio station (860 AM) licensed to Grand Forks, British Columbia, Canada
 CBRJ-FM, a radio station (97.9 FM) licensed to Phoenix, British Columbia